Onoseris is a genus of Mesoamerican and South American flowering plants in the family Asteraceae.

 Species

 Formerly included

Several species once considered members of Onoseris are now regarded as better suited to other genera:  Actinoseris, Criscia, Hieracium, Ianthopappus, Lycoseris, Noticastrum, Trichocline, and Urmenetea.

References

Asteraceae genera
Onoserideae